Luke and Q are an African-American R&B duo from New Orleans, United States best known for their 2006 hit single, "My Turn". The members include Luke Boyd (now known as Luke James) and Quinten Spears.

The duo met in eighth-grade when Luke overheard Q singing Ginuwine's, "Same Ol' G". As Luke recalls, "I was, like, You can sing, dog, but you may want to flip it," who then belted his version. They joined another childhood friend and formed a trio called Upskale, but the group disbanded almost as quickly as it began. The duo then began performing at local events, eventually singing background for R&B superstar, Tyrese.

Through Tyrese, they met production duo Damon Thomas and Harvey Mason Jr. of The Underdogs for Underdog Entertainment, and were introduced to Clive Davis who subsequently signed them to the J Records imprint in 2004. They released their debut song called, "My Turn". Spears has been inactive in the mainstream music business since.

Discography
Singles
2006: "My Turn"

References

External links
Luke and Q on Myspace

American musical duos
American contemporary R&B musical groups
Contemporary R&B duos
Musical groups from New Orleans